Changsheng may refer to:

Changsheng Bio-Technology, Changchun, China
Ever Power IPP Co., Ltd. or Changsheng Power
Changsheng Power Plant, Taoyuan, Taiwan
Luo teaching, or Changsheng teaching
A courtesy name of Guan Yu
Changsheng (長生國), the kingdom founded by Zhuang rebel, Nong Quanfu